Interferon alpha-21 is a protein that in humans is encoded by the IFNA21 gene.

References

Further reading